The Gimme Some Truth Documentary Festival is an annual documentary film festival in Winnipeg, Manitoba. Organized by the Winnipeg Film Group since 2008, the event is staged annually at the Cinematheque theatre.

The event is a qualifying festival for the Canadian Screen Awards.

References

External links

Documentary film festivals in Canada
Film festivals in Winnipeg
Film festivals established in 2008
2008 establishments in Manitoba